Thomas Kelly (13 September 1868 – 20 April 1942) was an Irish Sinn Féin and later Fianna Fáil politician. He was a book and picture dealer before entering politics. He was a founder member of Sinn Féin and was elected to Dublin City Council in 1899. Kelly was arrested after the 1916 Easter Rising and sent to prison in England, and after becoming seriously ill, he was released back to Dublin.

He was elected as a Sinn Féin MP for the Dublin St Stephens's Green constituency at the 1918 general election. In January 1919, Sinn Féin MPs refused to recognise the Parliament of the United Kingdom and instead assembled at the Mansion House in Dublin as a revolutionary parliament called Dáil Éireann.

Kelly was unanimously elected as Lord Mayor of Dublin while being held in Wormwood Scrubs prison in England. Due to his imprisonment, he was unable to formally take up the position.

He was re-elected unopposed at the 1921 elections for the Dublin South constituency. He supported the Anglo-Irish Treaty but was too ill to attend the Dáil vote. He served as substitute Minister for Labour from 19 March 1919 to end of October 1919. He was again re-elected at the 1922 general election as a member of Pro-Treaty Sinn Féin but did not take his seat in the Dáil.

He did not join Cumann na nGaedheal along with other pro-Treaty Sinn Féin TDs in 1923, nor did he contest the 1923 general election. In 1930 he joined Fianna Fáil and was elected as a Fianna Fáil Teachta Dála (TD) at the 1933 general election for Dublin South. He remained a TD and councillor until his death in 1942. No by-election was held to fill his seat.

References

1868 births
1942 deaths
Fianna Fáil TDs
Early Sinn Féin TDs
Members of the 1st Dáil
Members of the 2nd Dáil
Members of the 3rd Dáil
Members of the 8th Dáil
Members of the 9th Dáil
Members of the 10th Dáil
Members of the Parliament of the United Kingdom for County Dublin constituencies (1801–1922)
Politicians from County Dublin
UK MPs 1918–1922
Lord Mayors of Dublin